Erin McLean (born 9 November 1985) is a Canadian softball player. She competed in the women's tournament at the 2008 Summer Olympics. She played NAIA softball at Simon Fraser.

References

1985 births
Living people
Canadian softball players
Olympic softball players of Canada
Softball players at the 2008 Summer Olympics
People from Ajax, Ontario
Sportspeople from Ontario
Simon Fraser Red Leafs